St. Anthony's Catholic Church is a historic Spanish Colonial Revival-style church at 515 S. Morton Street in Okmulgee, Oklahoma, United States.  It was built in 1927 and added to the National Register of Historic Places in 1983.

The interior features tall, smooth-shafted  Corinthian columns topped with capitals enriched with acanthus leaves, caulicoli, and molded abacus.

References

Mission Revival architecture in Oklahoma
Buildings and structures in Okmulgee County, Oklahoma
Churches on the National Register of Historic Places in Oklahoma
Roman Catholic churches completed in 1927
Churches in the Roman Catholic Diocese of Tulsa
National Register of Historic Places in Okmulgee County, Oklahoma
20th-century Roman Catholic church buildings in the United States